List of governors of the Mexican state of Tabasco

See also
 List of Mexican state governors

Sources
 Governors of Tabasco

Specific

 
Taasco